Papiya Adhikari is a Bengali Indian actress and Jatra personality. She joined Bharatiya Janata Party On 17 February 2021.

Career
Adhikari was born in Kolkata, in the Indian state of West Bengal. In 1985, she first acted in Sonar Sansar, a movie directed by Ratish De Sarkar. She got the break through after playing the lead role in Soshane Kandche Lakkhi. Adhikari received best actress award from the Government of West Bengal for this performance. She played the role of heroin as well as supporting part in number of Bengali films. Adhikari is also active in small screen and Bengali tele-serials like Gachkouto, Chokher Tara Tui and Gangster Ganga.

Filmography
 Sonar Sansar
 Pratigna
 Swarnamoir Thikana
 Mouna Mukhar
 Agaman
 Pratik
 Pathe Jete Jete
 Nishi Badhu
 Abhisar
 Pratisodh (2004 film)
 Pati Param Guru
 Rajar Meye Parul
 Sampradan
 Mayer Adar
 Shanka
 Hanshi Khushi Club
 Rose Crazy Rose
 Probahini
 Kintu Galpo Noy
 Babli
 Moner Majhe Tumi
 Sotoroi September
 Ami Jajabor

References

External links
 

Living people
Actresses in Bengali cinema
Indian film actresses
Actresses from Kolkata
20th-century Indian actresses
21st-century Indian actresses
Year of birth missing (living people)